Randall may refer to the following:

Places

United States
Randall, California, former name of White Hall, California, an unincorporated community
Randall, Indiana, a former town
Randall, Iowa, a city
Randall, Kansas, a city
Randall, Minnesota, a city
Randall, West Virginia, an unincorporated community
Randall, Wisconsin, a town
Randall, Burnett County, Wisconsin, an unincorporated community
Randall County, Texas
Randall Creek, in Nebraska and South Dakota
Randall's Island, part of New York City
Camp Randall, Madison, Wisconsin, a former army camp, on the National Register of Historic Places
Fort Randall, South Dakota, a former military base, on the National Register of Historic Places

Elsewhere
Mount Randall, Victoria Land, Antarctica
Randall Rocks, Graham Land, Antarctica
Randall, a community in the town of New Tecumseth, Ontario, Canada

Businesses
Randall Amplifiers, a manufacturer of guitar amplifiers
Randall House Publications, American publisher
Randall Made Knives, a manufacturer of knives
Randalls, a retail grocery store chain based in Houston, Texas

Schools and institutes
Randall Division of Cell and Molecular Biophysics (the Randall), a research institute of King's College London 
Randall University, a Christian liberal arts college in Moore, Oklahoma
Randall High School (Amarillo, Texas), a public school
Randall Junior High School, Washington, DC, on the National Register of Historic Places

Ships
, a US Navy attack transport ship in World War II
, a US Navy troop ship in World War II
, a US World War II Liberty shop

People
Randall (given name)
Randall (surname)

Fictional characters

Given name
Randall Boggs, a character and the main antagonist in the Monsters, Inc. franchise
Randall "Randy" Disher, on the American TV series Monk
Randall Flagg, in works by Stephen King
Randall Pearson, from the American TV series This Is Us
Randall Shire, in the Marvel Comics Universe
Randall Weems, from the American animated TV series Recess
Randall or Randy, a character in Trailer Park Boys

Surname
Hester Randall, on the Channel 5 soap opera Family Affairs
Jeff Randall, a character in two British TV series, both titled Randall and Hopkirk (Deceased) (1969, 2000)
Josh Randall, on the American TV series Wanted: Dead or Alive, played by Steve McQueen
Lucas Randall, on the Canadian TV series Strange Days at Blake Holsey High
Rex Randall, on the Channel 5 soap opera Family Affairs
Tex Randall, a 47-foot tall cowboy figure constructed in 1959 in Canyon, Texas
Lieutenant Randall, a non-playable character in the video game Call of Duty 2

Other uses
Randall Airport, a public use airport in Orange County, New York
Randall Building (disambiguation)
Randall Children's Hospital at Legacy Emanuel, Portland, Oregon
Randall House (disambiguation)
Randall Museum, San Francisco, California
Randall Road, a major roadway in Illinois

See also
"Lord Randall", a British ballad
 Randal (disambiguation)
 Randell
 Randel
 Randle